Ashley Cowan (born 7 May 1975) is a former English cricketer; his career spanned from 1995 to 2005. He is a right-handed batsman and a right-arm medium-fast bowler.

He played for Essex throughout the whole of his career between 1995 and his benefit season of 2006. His debut first-class match, against Derbyshire, came in August 1995. In the latter stages of his first-class career he fluctuated between Division Two and Division One with his team, finally finishing midtable in the 2005 Frizell County Championship second division.

He no longer plays first-class cricket as of 2006, his career accolades including a Benson and Hedges Cup final appearance during 1998 in which he finished not out at the close of the innings, thus sealing a comfortable win for his Essex side.

His benefit year was sponsored by a lap-dancing club called The Cave.

Footnotes

References
  
  
  

1975 births
Living people
People educated at Framlingham College
English cricketers
Essex cricketers
NBC Denis Compton Award recipients
Cambridgeshire cricketers
Test and County Cricket Board XI cricketers